The Rapillard House is a historic house at 123 West 7th Street in North Little Rock, Arkansas.  It is a two-story structure, with a steeply pitched gable roof, and an exterior of brick and stucco.  A two-story cross-gabled section flanks the entrance on the right, while the roof above the center and left bays is broken by gabled dormers.  A porch extends across the left two bays.  The house was built in 1927, and is a good local example of vernacular English Revival architecture.

The house was listed on the National Register of Historic Places in 1993.

See also
National Register of Historic Places listings in Pulaski County, Arkansas

References

Houses on the National Register of Historic Places in Arkansas
Houses completed in 1927
Houses in North Little Rock, Arkansas